Daulatpur Chowk is a Nagar Panchayat in Tehsil Ghanari of Una district  in the State of Himachal Pradesh, India.  Daulatpur Chowk is also connected through Railway line which comes from Una Himachal . Railway station of Daulatpur chowk is situated in the nearby village Chalet  which is approximately 2 km from Bus Stand.

Geography
It has an average elevation of 521 metres (1709 feet).

Demographics
 India census, Daulatpur had a population of 3765. Males constitute 50% of the population and females 50%. Daulatpur has an average literacy rate of 79%, higher than the national average of 74.04%: male literacy is 82% and, female literacy is 76%. In Daulatpur, 11% of the population is under 6 years of age. 

1. The main crop in Daulatpur is wheat, which is common in Punjab region

2. The very famous temple of Hindu Goddess Mata Chintapurni is nearby (approximately 18 k.m.)

3. Kua Devi temple is also a pride of the region which is approx 3km far.

4. Famous Gurudwara and Shiv temple is located in nearby village Babehar. Annual function on Holiday and Baisakhi is celebrated here.

5. Kuneran Railway station's new name is Mata Chintapurni Station

6. Main market of Daulatpur is nearby Daulatpur Chowk

References

Cities and towns in Una district